Aurore Palmgren (28 March 1880 – 28 June 1961) was a Swedish film actress.

Selected filmography

References

Bibliography 
 Rasmussen, Bjørn. Filmens hvem-vad-hvor: Udenlanske film 1950-1967. Politiken, 1968.

External links 
 

1880 births
1961 deaths
Actresses from Stockholm
Swedish film actresses
20th-century Swedish actresses